Dermacoccus is a Gram-positive, non-spore-forming, chemoorganotrophic and aerobic genus of bacteria from the family of Dermacoccaceae.

References

Further reading 
 
 

 

Micrococcales
Bacteria genera